The 1979 Virginia 500 was the 9th stock car race of the 1979 NASCAR Winston Cup Series season. The race took place at Martinsville Speedway in Martinsville, Virginia on April 22, 1979 before a crowd of 35,500. Richard Petty, driving for his team Petty Enterprises would win the race by 4 seconds, leading 247 laps. Buddy Baker of Ranier-Lundy Racing and Darrell Waltrip of DiGard Motorsports would finish 2nd and 3rd, respectively.

Background

Qualifying

Race results

References 

1979 NASCAR Winston Cup Series
1979 in sports in Virginia
April 1979 sports events in the United States
NASCAR races at Martinsville Speedway